Gresik Regency (older spelling: Grissee) is a regency within East Java Province of Indonesia. As well as a large part of the Surabaya northern and western suburbs, it includes the offshore Bawean Island, some 125 km to the north of Java and Madura. The regency's administrative centre is the town of Gresik, about 25 km to the northwest of Surabaya. Gresik Regency (excluding Bawean Island) is also part of Gerbangkertosusila, the metropolitan region of Surabaya.

Etymology
Thomas Stamford Raffles in his book, The History of Java, reveals that the name of Gresik comes from the word Giri Gisik, which means "mountain near the coast", referring to the hilly topography of the Gresik town center near the coast.

History
Since the 11th century, Gresik has become an international trade center visited by many nations such as, Chinese, Arabs, Champa, and Gujarat. Gresik Regency is also the first entry point for Islam in Java, which among others is marked by the existence of ancient Islamic tombs from Sheikh Maulana Malik Ibrahim and Fatimah bint Maimun. Gresik has become one of the main ports and trade cities that are quite important since the 14th century, as well as being a haven for ships from Maluku to Sumatra and mainland Asia (including India and Persia). This continued until the VOC era.

The port of Gresik-Djaratan  has functioned as an important commercial center since the eleventh century, trading with merchants from as far away as China, India, and Arabia. Some of these traders helped spread Islam in the area. In 1487 Sunan Giri, also known as Sultan Ainul Yaqin, began to rule Gresik. In his 1515 book, Suma Oriental, the Portuguese apothecary and traveller Tomé Pires described Gresik as "the jewel of Java in trading ports". Sunan Giri's descendants ruled the area for the following two centuries.

Initially the Gresik region was part of the Surabaya Regency. In 1974, the Central Government issued PP No. 38 of 1974. All government activities began to be gradually transferred to Gresik and the name changed to Gresik Regency with a center of activity in Gresik town. Also in 1974 the Indonesian government made Gresik, now a suburb of Surabaya, part of Gerbangkertosusila Metropolitan Area, official metropolitan region by Government.

21st-century Gresik 
The city has a reputation for its many coffee shops, called warkop (from warung kopi).  In 2002, Petrokimia Putra (owned by PT Petrokimia Gresik), a soccer club from Gresik, has one national league title.

Administration 
The Gresik Regency is divided into eighteen administrative districts (kecamatan). The districts are tabulated below with their areas and their populations at the 2010 census and the 2020 census The table also includes the number of administrative villages (330 rural desa and 26 urban kelurahan) in each district and its post code.

Sangkapura and Tambak districts together constitute the island of Bawean, lying to the north of Madura but administratively a part of Gresik Regency.

Industry
A large number of industries have established themselves in Gresik, mainly supporting agriculture and agricultural machinery. A lot of home-based industry exists, making caps (songkoks), bags, etc.

One of the largest factories in Gresik are Semen Gresik (Gresik Portland Cement) and Petrokimia Gresik. Semen Gresik, the largest cement factory in Indonesia, supplies 41% of the Indonesian market; while Petrokimia Gresik, the most complete fertilizer producer in Indonesia, supplies 50% of national subsidized fertilizers.

Climate 
Gresik has 44-88% of humidity. The maximum humidity is 88% and the average humidity is 58%.  The wind velocity of Gresik is within the range of 0–18 km/hour. The maximum wind velocity is 18 km/hour and the average is 12.6 km/hour. The temperature of this city is within the range of 23 °C-35 °C with the average temperature is 28.5 °C.

References

Further reading

External links

Official Information Center of Gresik Regency
Gresik Tourism Photo Galleries